The Morehead-Cain Scholarship (originally the Morehead Scholarship) was the first merit scholarship program established in the United States. It was founded at the University of North Carolina at Chapel Hill in 1951 and was named for its benefactors, John Motley Morehead III and the Gordon and Mary Cain Foundation. 

In addition to covering all expenses for four years of undergraduate education at UNC, the scholarship also includes fully funded summer enrichment activities and funding for independent research, internships, and international study. Mary Cain, who donated $100 million to the program in 2007, called it "the gold standard in undergraduate educational opportunities."

History
In 1945 businessman, industrial scientist, and philanthropist John Motley Morehead III bequeathed $130 million to the University of North Carolina at Chapel Hill (UNC) to create the John Motley Morehead Foundation and the university's planetarium. The Morehead Foundation created the Morehead Scholarship Program in 1951. This was the first nonathletic merit scholarship program in the United States. This undergraduate scholarship covers all expenses for four years of study at UNC. Morehead-Cain scholars can also access " a network of peers and mentors, challenging internships and summer experiences, and an opportunity to travel the world." The scholarship was designed to attract "gifted student leaders" from across North Carolina to the university.

The Morehead Scholarship's first director was Robert Fetzer, a former UNC track coach and athletic director. In 1958, he was replaced by Roy Armstrong, former director of admissions at the university. In 1972, Mebane M. Pritchett, a Morehead alumnus, became the executive director and served until 1987. Charles E. Lovelace Jr., another Morehead alumnus, was the next president. The current president is Chris Bradford.

Originally just for students from North Carolina, the program expanded to include students from across the United States in 1954. In 1968, the first Morehead scholar from Great Britain was selected, followed by the inclusion of women in 1974. The program now includes students from Canada and various other countries. In 2022, the incoming freshman class of Morehead-Cain scholars includes 75 students—41 scholars from North Carolina, 34 from other states, and ten international scholars from Canada, India, South Sudan, the United Kingdom, and Vietnam.

The foundation and scholarship were both renamed Morehead-Cain in 2007 after the Gordon and Mary Cain Foundation contributed $100 million to expand the program. Mary Cain gave this gift in honor of her husband Gordan, who was a major stockholder in Union Carbide and helped found Texas Petrochemicals. Before her gift, the Morehead Foundation had $115 million.

Selection process
When the scholarship program started, high school seniors were nominated by their high school administrators. By the 2000s, students could also apply directly for the scholarship. In addition, the UNC admissions office also nominates potential candidates for the scholarship.

The selection process is extremely rigorous and intensely competitive. There are several rounds of interviews and activities. Annually, there are around 2,000 applicants; only three percent of each year's nominees are selected. The criteria for selection are character, leadership, physical vigor, and scholarship. Around 50 to 75 scholarships are offered each year, with about 200 Morehead scholars on campus at any one time.

Summer Enrichment Program
Starting in 1974, the scholarship began providing opportunities for international travel and internships through the Morehead Summer Enrichment Program. The program is now structured across four summers and fully funds activities in four areas: a three-week outdoor leadership course, research or travel across five to twelve weeks to provide a global perspective, professional experience through an internship, and working on a community's challenges for eight to ten weeks to gain an understanding of citizenship and civic collaboration.

Notable alumni

 Bill Bamberger, documentary photographer and photojournalist
 David Baron, CEO and co-founder of Nugget Comfort
 Jerry Blackwell, Minnesota Special Assistant Attorney General and prosecutor in the Derek Chauvin murder trial
 Keith Bradsher, New York Times journalist and Pulitzer Prize winner 
 Taylor Branch, Pulitzer Prize winning author and historian 
 Frank Bruni, New York Times journalist
 Casey Burns, graphic illustrator, poster designer
 Galahad Clark, founder of Vivobarefoot
 Francis Collins, former director of the National Institutes of Health and the Human Genome Project
 Jim Cooper, U.S. Congressman
 Roy A. Cooper, Governor of North Carolina
 Becca Crabb, senior software engineer at Carbon
 James G. Exum, chief justice of the North Carolina Supreme Court
 Bobby Evans, former general manager of the San Francisco Giants
 Adam Falk, president of the Alfred P. Sloan Foundation
 David Gardner, co-founder of the Motley Fool
 Tyrell Godwin, Major League Baseball player 
 Shilpi Somaya Gowda, best-selling novelist 
 Anthony Stephen Harrington, U.S. Ambassador to Brazil
 Peter Blair Henry, dean of New York University Stern School of Business
 Gill Holland, film producer
 Ricky Hurtado, co-director of the North Carolina Scholar’s Latinx Initiative and named to Forbes 30 Under 30 list for education
 Sallie Krawcheck, CEO of Citicorp from 2002-2008, named by Forbes to its list of The World's 100 Most Powerful Women
 Ann Livermore, director of Hewlett-Packard 2004 - 2011
 Mike McIntyre, U.S. Congressman
 Jesse Moore, co-founder of M-KOPA Solar
 Alan Murray, editor of Fortune and former Washington Bureau Chief of CNBC
 Cristy Page, chair of the UNC Department of Family Medicine
 Ed Perkins, Oscar-nominated documentarian
 Jessica Polka, director of non-profit ASAPbio
 David Price, U.S. Congressman
 Jonathan Reckford, CEO of Habitat for Humanity International
 Katie Reilly, reporter for TIME
 James Reston Jr., journalist and writer
 Danae Ringelmann, co-founder of Indiegogo
 Jennifer Roberts, former mayor of Charlotte, North Carolina
 Norman E. Sharpless, director of the National Cancer Institute
 Clive Stafford Smith, the human rights lawyer
 Jennifer Steinbrenner, president of the New York Yankees Foundation and the New York Yankees Tampa Foundation
 Karen Stevenson, U.S. Magistrate Judge and the first black woman from the United States to win the Rhodes Scholarship
 Tim Sullivan, chair of Ancestry.com
 James Surowiecki, journalist and staff writer for The New Yorker
 Bill Swofford, 1960s pop singer known as Oliver whose songs "Good Morning, Starshine" and "Jean" became top-three Billboard hits
 John Swofford, Atlantic Coast Conference commissioner
 Jim Tanner, National Basketball Association and Women's National Basketball Association agent and founder of Tandem Sports
 G. Kennedy Thompson, former president and CEO of Wachovia Corporation and First Union
 Malcolm Turner, former president of the NBA G-League
 Richard Vinroot, former mayor of Charlotte, North Carolina
 George L. Wainwright Jr., former Associate Justice of the North Carolina Supreme Court
 Tony Waldrop,  record-setting track-and-field athlete and president of the University of South Alabama
 Laurel Wamsley, reporter for NPR
 Dennis Whittle, co-founder GlobalGiving
 Candice Woodcock, a contestant on Survivor: Cook Islands and Survivor: Heroes vs. Villains

See also 

 Jefferson Scholarship

References

Scholarships in the United States
University of North Carolina at Chapel Hill
Morehead family